The coat of arms of the Gambia has been in use since 18 November 1964. It depicts two lions holding an axe and hoe, supporting a shield that depicts another pair of hoe and axe, crossed. Atop the shield is set the heraldic helmet and an oil palm as a crest. At the bottom is the national motto: Progress – Peace – Prosperity. The Gambian coat of arms also appeared in the fly of the Gambian air force ensign.

Overview
The two lions represent the colonial history of The Gambia as part of the British Empire. The crossed axe and hoe represent the importance of agriculture to The Gambia. They are also considered to represent the two major ethnic groups of The Gambia: the Mandinka and the Fulani. The crest, a palm tree, is also a vital national tree.

The design was created by Nicholas Potin, a government employee with the Department of Surveys, who won a national competition to design it.

Variations
Coat of arms of Gambia Armed Forces service branches had variations: 
 Coat of arms used by the Gambian Army had a crossed sword in the shield.
 Coat of arms used by the Gambian Navy had an anchor in the shield.
 Coat of arms used by the Gambian Air Force had an eagle above national coat of arms.

See also
Flag of the Gambia

References

External links
Image of Gambian coat of arms

National symbols of the Gambia
Gambia
Gambia
Gambia
Gambia
Gambia